The Hundred of Glyde is a Hundred of Palmerston County, Northern Territory Australia.

This Hundred is at Latitude -12°46'S and Longitude 130°22'E lying south of Bynoe Harbour in the Palmerston County and was one of the first 13 Hundreds gazetted in the Northern Territory in 1871.
The Hundred of Glyde was named after Lavington Glyde, a parliamentarian in South Australia. The Hundred also includes Fog Bay, Northern Territory.

See also
Hundred of Glyde (South Australia)

References

 

Hundreds of the Northern Territory